Tjokorda Oka Artha Ardana Sukawati, known as Cok Ace (born 23 August 1957) is an Indonesian politician who is the Deputy Governor of Bali.

References 

Living people
1957 births
21st-century Indonesian politicians
People from Gianyar Regency
Balinese people
Indonesian Hindus